Criterion Hotel may refer to:

Australia

Queensland 
 Criterion Hotel, Maryborough
 Criterion Hotel, Rockhampton
 Criterion Hotel, Warwick

Western Australia 
 Criterion Hotel, Perth